Spring Bluff is an unincorporated community in Camden County, Georgia, United States.

Historian Kenneth Krakow wrote in 1975 that the name Spring Bluff was "over 200 years" old.

References

Unincorporated communities in Georgia (U.S. state)
Unincorporated communities in Camden County, Georgia